Perth Lade (also known as King's Lade) is an historic -long watercourse (colloquially known as a mill race) in Perth and Kinross, Scotland. Created in the 11th century or earlier, it has been used to power several watermills, such as those that functioned at Perth's Lower City Mills, which have existed since the 18th century. Over its course, at least nineteen industrial sites existed; today, the remains of nine of these can be seen, the rest lost to inner-city development and housing schemes of the 20th and 21st centuries. A footpath follows the majority of the lade's course.

History
In 1306, Edward I, then occupying the city, ordered a new ditch to be dug as part of a defence. It may have been an extension of the lade to the west and south. With this defence, and that Perth could be provisioned, via the River Tay, it meant that it was not until 1313 that Robert the Bruce could recapture the city.

Course

After travelling northeast for 750 feet, it turns southeast, at which point is passes beneath Bleachers Way in Huntingtower. After passing beneath three more streets in quick succession, it turns northeast again at Castle Brae. Another turn, to the southeast, occurs about 700 feet later as it enters Ruthvenfield. As it runs parallel to Castle Brae it flows beneath Ruthvenfield Road.

A short distance later, it goes underground for 500 feet, reemerging just after a street named Ruthven Lade.

After continuing southeast for about 450 feet, it turns due east as it approaches the link road between the A85 Crieff Road and the A9 northbound. It passes under both, as well as the southbound link road between the A9 and the A85, before running to the north of McDiarmid Park and Perth Crematorium. Walkers will traverse the Inveralmond Skywalk Footbridge around this point.

It continues due east for around 1,500 feet, into Tulloch, where it loops around the northern curve of Primrose Crescent and continues behind Tulloch Primary School.

After passing through the area of the former J. Pullar and Sons dyeworks, to the north of Sandeman Court and Bracken Brae, its course turns due south as it meets the railway. It loops to the west, around the railway sidings and crosses the edge of Kinnoull F.C.'s Tulloch Park property.

As the Lade approaches Crieff Road, it turns to the east again and passes beneath the railway line (where a footbridge crosses the line) and loops around the former location of Jeanfield Swifts F.C.'s Simpson Park home.

Course alteration
The junction where the lade forked to provide water for the Balhousie mill was known as the Boot of Balhousie. The Laird of Balhousie asked the king for permission to take a bootful of water from the lade, and it was granted.

After passing through the City Mills, a southern spur of the lade flowed south along the line of South Methven Street, around Canal Crescent, and turned east along Canal Street, where small boats were used to offload coal from larger vessels on the Tay, while flour from the mills was also transported.

A smaller branch of the lade continued south along the line of King Street, across the South Inch, to link up with Craigie Burn. This extension was covered over in 1802.

Facilities powered by the lade
The following facilities are (or were) located on the banks of the lade and harnessed its power (ordered from Almondbank to Perth):

Pitcairnfield Bleachworks
Huntingtower Bleachworks
Shepherds Mill
Dorwards Pump
Ruthvenfield Bleachworks
Tulloch Dye Works
Balhousie Grain Mill
Pullars Dye Works
Mill Street Mill
Upper and Lower City Mills
Old Waterworks

Gallery

References

External link
The Lade Lower City Mills Perth Perthshire Scotland – tourscotland, YouTube, 4 April, 2018

Tay catchment
Rivers of Perth and Kinross
Landforms of Perth, Scotland